Catching Tales is the fourth album by Jamie Cullum. It was released in late September 2005 in the United Kingdom and a few weeks later in the United States.

Background
This release followed Twentysomething, Cullum's biggest seller to date. Like that album, Cullum performs some original material as well as some covers and standards. The first single from the album was "Get Your Way", followed by "Mind Trick" later in 2005. In 2006, "Photograph" was released as a single.

Stewart Levine, producer of Twentysomething, repeated duties on this album. Additionally, renowned hip hop DJ and Gorillaz member Dan Nakamura (aka Dan the Automator) helped to produce the first track "Get Your Way".

The European version of the album features the Gershwin tune "Fascinating Rhythm", unlike the American and French versions. A deluxe edition was released and came with a DVD including an 18-minute feature entitled "Telling Tales", a behind-the-scenes documentary about the making and promotion of the album.

In the Netherlands, an exclusive Dutch edition of the album was released. This edition came with a bonus CD which includes the two songs "All at Sea" and "Everlasting Love", performed live at BNN's That's Live.

Cullum has toured extensively around the world in support of the album.

Track listing

Charts

Weekly charts

Year-end charts

Certifications and sales

References

2005 albums
Jamie Cullum albums
Verve Records albums
Albums produced by Stewart Levine